The Helisii were one of the tribal states of the Lugii, a Germanic tribe. They were attested by the Roman historian Tacitus (Germania 43:3); this brief reference is the only mention of them as such in history.

Ancient sources consider the border between Greater Germany and Scythia to be the River Vistula. It, however, bends to the east to place all of central and southern Poland on the ancient Germania bank.

That Germanic expansion reached  western Poland at least is unquestioned. Silesia was German in later historical times. It probably was the home of the Lugii, who are supposed in the sources to be in the eastern half of Suebia, which name descends to modern Schwaben. The Suebi were divided by the Black Forest. Today's Black Forest, which is a scarcely forested remnant, does not fit the description, but in ancient times it must have extended across most of southern Schwaben. The Lugii, then, as eastern Suebi, were most likely in Poland and Czechoslovakia.

Considering the location, it is possible that Tacitus' name of Helisii is a Germanic form of the ancient municipality of Kalisz in central Poland, often identified with Ptolemy's Calisia, which was in Greater Germany. Helisii would in that case be from *Kalisii. Its location in Ptolemy may not be its modern location, as settlement names over time tend to duplicate or migrate along with their populations.

See also
List of ancient Germanic peoples

Sources
Tacitus, Germania.XLIII

Early Germanic peoples
Lugii